Trump Media & Technology Group (TMTG), also known as T Media Tech LLC, is an American media and technology company founded in 2021 by former U.S. president Donald Trump. In October 2021, the company announced a merger agreement with Digital World Acquisition Corp. (DWAC), a publicly traded special-purpose acquisition company formed that May by a Miami banker, who benefited by perhaps $420 million and came under scrutiny for having possibly improperly planned such a deal with Trump prior to going public.

Since January 2022, former U.S. representative Devin Nunes has served as the company's chief executive officer. In February 2022, TMTG launched the social network Truth Social.

Operations 
Incorporated in February 2021, Trump Media & Technology Group intended to use a special-purpose acquisition company (SPAC) to facilitate its becoming a publicly traded company. On October 20, 2021, TMTG and Digital World Acquisition Corp. (DWAC), a publicly traded SPAC, announced that they had entered into a definitive merger agreement that would combine the two entities, allowing TMTG to become a publicly traded company. DWAC was created with the help of ARC Capital, a Shanghai-based firm specializing in listing Chinese companies on American stock markets that has been a target of U.S. Securities and Exchange Commission (SEC) investigations for misrepresenting shell corporations. Some investors were surprised to learn that their investment money was being used to finance a Trump company. In 2021, the DWAC Trump venture was linked with another company, China Yunhong Holdings, based in Wuhan, Hubei, until its lead banker who was running the merger promised to sever ties with China in December 2021, stating that Yunhong was to "dissolve and liquidate". In February 2022, Reuters reported that the connection between Shanghai-based ARC Capital and Digital World was more extensive than thought, with ARC having offered money to get the SPAC off the ground.

The company's announced future product offerings include a social network (Truth Social) and on-demand programming (TMTG+). 

In December 2021, TMTG said it had raised $1 billion in private investment in public equity (PIPE) funding. The investors are unidentified. The Financial Times reported the expected proceeds of the PIPE and SPAC funding to TMTG would be $1.25 billion.

On December 14, 2021, TMTG announced that it had entered into a "wide-ranging technology and cloud services agreement" with video platform Rumble, and that Rumble would operate part of the Truth Social network as well as TMTG+.

On January 1, 2022, Devin Nunes  resigned his seat from the U.S. House of Representatives to become the company's chief executive officer. 

In September 2022, DWAC secured an extension from shareholders for up to six months for it to perform the TMTG deal. This left DWAC shares trading at $24, down from a 2021 high of $175.

Truth Social 

On February 21, 2022, TMTG released Truth Social, a competitor to platforms such as Twitter, on iOS. Truth Social faced staffing issues due to its political associations, and in early April 2022, Reuters reported that the company's head of technology and head of product development had resigned their posts following the network's "troubled" launch.

After Elon Musk disclosed his large stake in and intent to buy out Twitter in April 2022, holding company DWAC lost 44% of its stock value. Matthew Kennedy, a market strategist at Renaissance Capital, said that the buyout was troubling for Digital World as a Musk-owned Twitter would undercut the rationale behind Truth Social's existence.

On April 22, 2022, Rumble announced that Truth Social had successfully migrated its website and mobile applications to Rumble's cloud infrastructure.

Legal issues 
The New York Times reported days after the TMTG deal was announced that the founder of the DWAC SPAC, Miami banker Patrick Orlando, had been discussing the deal with Trump since at least March 2021. The formation of the SPAC was announced in May 2021 and it was taken public that September. The Times reported that by mid-2021, people affiliated with TMTG were telling Wall Street investors that the company was nearing a deal to merge with a SPAC. DWAC was not specifically named, but if it was the SPAC in question this may have skirted securities laws and stock exchange rules, since SPACs are not allowed to have a target company in mind prior to going public. Trump and Orlando had initially discussed a deal through another of Orlando's SPACs that was already publicly traded, but it was deemed too small for the Trump deal. Some bankers told the Times that because the deal discussions began when the first SPAC was being considered, which would be proper, an argument could be made that discussions did not occur after the SPAC was formed, which would be improper. DWAC stated in three prospectuses that it had not had "any substantive discussions, directly or indirectly, with any business combination target." According to Reuters, Orlando's stake in DWAC increased by $420 million from the original $3 million he invested.

DWAC disclosed in a December 2021 regulatory filing that the SEC and the Financial Industry Regulatory Authority had weeks earlier asked it for information about stock trading and communications with TMTG prior to their deal being announced. The company disclosed in June 2022 that the SEC was expanding its inquiry, and days later said a grand jury seated by the U.S. Attorney for the Southern District of New York (SDNY) had subpoenaed DWAC and each member of its board, as well as documents.

The Sarasota Herald-Tribune reported in July 2022 that according to Florida state records, Trump left as chairman of TMTG less than a month before the company received subpoenas from the SEC and the New York grand jury, concurrent with the DWAC subpoenas. His son Donald Trump Jr. and former Trump administration official Kash Patel were among others who simultaneously left the TMTG board of directors. Truth Social denied the report. Axios later published records filed by TMTG's agent with the Florida Division of Corporations; an April 28 filing showed Trump and others listed as "director," while a June 8 filing to change "person, title or capacity" directed the Division to "remove" Trump and others.

The Guardian reported in March 2023 that in 2022 the SDNY expanded its criminal investigation to include whether TMTG engaged in money laundering. Beginning in December 2021, when the company was in danger of collapsing because its merger with DWAC had been delayed, it received two loans totaling $8 million from obscure Vladimir Putin-linked entities. Two million dollars was paid by Paxum Bank, part-owned by Anton Postolnikov, a relation of Aleksandr Smirnov, a former Russian government official who now runs the Russian maritime company Rosmorport. Another $6 million was paid by an ostensibly separate entity, ES Family Trust, whose director was the director of Paxum Bank at the same time.

Notable stockholders
In October 2021 it was reported, based on information provided by congresstrading.com, that House representative Marjorie Taylor Greene  had purchased between $15,000 and $50,000 DWAC shares after the Trump merger was announced.

References

External links 
 
 Digital World Acquisition Corp. website

2021 establishments in Florida
American companies established in 2021
Mass media companies established in 2021
Technology companies established in 2021
Business career of Donald Trump
Palm Beach, Florida
Companies based in Palm Beach County, Florida